The king and the god is the title of a short dialogue composed in the reconstructed Proto-Indo-European language. It is loosely based on the "King Harishchandra" episode of Aitareya Brahmana (7.14). S. K. Sen asked a number of Indo-Europeanists (Y. E. Arbeitman, Eric P. Hamp, Manfred Mayrhofer, Jaan Puhvel, Werner Winter, Winfred P. Lehmann) to reconstruct the PIE "parent" of the text.

The king and the god 
Hamp's/Sen's version from the EIEC (1997:503), which differs from Hamp's original version in replacing Hamp's Lughus with Sen's Werunos:

Winfred P. Lehmann's version

 

The EIEC spelling largely corresponds to that used in the Proto-Indo-European language article, with ha for h2 and hx for unspecified laryngeals h. Further differences include Lehmann's avoidance of the augment, and of the palato-alveolars as distinctive phonemes. However, the differences in reconstructions are more probably due to differences in theoretical viewpoint. The EIEC spelling is a more direct result of the reconstruction process, while having typologically too many marked features to be a language really spoken some time in that form, whereas Lehmann represents the position to attain the most probable natural language to show up in reconstruction the way PIE is.

Andrew Byrd's version

Linguist Andrew Byrd has produced and recorded his own translation to reconstructed PIE.

 

English translation:

 Once there was a king. He was childless. The king wanted a son. He asked his priest: "May a son be born to me!" The priest said to the king: "Pray to the god Werunos." The king approached the god Werunos to pray now to the god. "Hear me, father Werunos!" The god Werunos came down from heaven. "What do you want?" "I want a son." "Let this be so," said the bright god Werunos. The king's lady bore a son.

See also 
 Schleicher's fable

References

Bibliography
 .
 .
, reprinted in 1980. Online version edited by University of Michigan, 2008 , on books.google:  .

External links 
 What was the earliest ancestor of English like? by Geoffrey Sampson, with a simplified spelling of the EIEC version.

Indo-European linguistics
Proto-Indo-European language
1994 in science
1994 short stories
Comparison of Indo-European languages
Brahmanas
Multilingual texts